For the mathematician, see Efim Zelmanov.

Želmanovce is a village and municipality in Svidník District in the Prešov Region of north-eastern Slovakia. Its population is about 340 people.

History
In historical records the village was first mentioned in 1371.

External links
 
 
http://www.statistics.sk/mosmis/eng/run.html

Villages and municipalities in Svidník District
Šariš